Oleksandr Oles (real name Oleksandr Ivanovych Kandyba) (1878–1944) was a prominent Ukrainian writer and poet. He is the father of another Ukrainian poet and political activist, Oleh Olzhych, who perished in the Nazi labor camps in 1944.

Life
He was born in 1878 in the khutir (small village) of Kandyba (now the village of Kandybyne, Bilopillia raion, Sumy Oblast) in Kharkiv province. He studied at the Kharkiv agriculture school, later at the Kharkiv veterinary institute. 

He is one of representatives of the Ukrainian Cossack family of Kandyba. 

In 1907 he married Vira Svadkovska. They had a son - Oleh Olzhych, who also became a famous Ukrainian poet.

Collections
Among his poetic collections are "Z zhurboyu radist obnymalas" — With Sadness a Joy was Embracing, "Komu povim pechal moyu" — To Whom I'll Tell About My Woes, and others (nine poetry books altogether). Oleksandr Oles also created several dramatic works.

Death
Oles died in emigration in Prague in 1944. He was buried there until early January 2016 when his and his wife remains were exhumed and replaced by the body of Volodymyr Mykhailyshyn, who was the man that had been paying for the family grave. On 29 January 2017 Oles and his wife Vira were reburied, paid for by the Ukrainian government, in (Ukraine's capital) Kyiv, in the Lukyanivske cemetery. President of Ukraine Petro Poroshenko and his wife Maryna Poroshenko took part in this ceremony.

Example of his work
The sky has embraced the sea,
The sea has spilled into the sky…
The whole world they have forgotten
And have sunk in the fogs of the sky
I have dreamed of being with you,
Our souls are close mates.
You are like the blue sky
And your thoughts are like wandering clouds.

References

External links
Poetry of Oleksandr Oles, in Ukrainian

1878 births
1944 deaths
People from Sumy Oblast
People from Sumsky Uyezd
Ukrainian people in the Russian Empire
20th-century Ukrainian poets
Ukrainian male poets
Ukrainian dramatists and playwrights
20th-century male writers